Las Villuercas is a comarca located in the province of Cáceres, western Spain. It belongs to the Autonomous Community of Extremadura.

Despite the traditional strong identity of its inhabitants, this historical region has not been able to achieve the necessary legal recognition for its administrative development. The comarca has a total of about 9,000 inhabitants.

Its geography is typical of the Meseta Central. The Sierra de Villuercas, also known as Sierra de Guadalupe is part of this comarca.

The comarca is named after La Villuerca, the highest peak in the range and also the highest point of the greater Montes de Toledo system, an ancient name that has been documented since 1353.

Municipalities 
The comarca contains the following municipalities:
 Alía
  Cíjara
  Puerto Rey
  La Calera
 Berzocana
 Cabañas del Castillo
  Solana de Cabañas
 Retamosa de Cabañas
  Roturas de Cabañas
 Cañamero
 Guadalupe
 Logrosán
 Navezuelas
 Robledollano

References

External links

 Las Villuercas
 Guidebook to Las Villuercas - Ibores (Spanish)
 Birdwatching
 Pictures of las Villuercas

Comarcas of Extremadura
Province of Cáceres
Historical regions in Spain